Oryzidium is a genus of African plants in the grass family.

Species
The only known species is Oryzidium barnardii, native to Angola, Zambia, Zimbabwe, Botswana, and Namibia.

References

Panicoideae
Grasses of Africa
Flora of Southern Africa
Monotypic Poaceae genera